Captain John William Pinder DFC (14 February 1898 – 16 August 1920) was a British First World War flying ace, who flew for the Royal Navy Air Service, and later the Royal Air Force.

Early life
John William Pinder was born on 14 February 1898 in Deal, Kent, England.

World War I service
Pinder joined military service for World War I when old enough. On 22 October 1916, he was appointed as a probationary flight officer in the Royal Naval Air Service and posted to its headquarters on HMS President. On 3 January 1917 he was riding in the rear seat of Curtiss JN4 serial number 8820 when it crashlanded at Redcar, tearing off the undercarriage and damaging the propeller.

After completion of training as a pilot, he was posted to No. 9 Squadron RNAS. During the unit's operations along the Belgian coast, he scored his first three aerial victories. He was subsequently appointed a flight commander and transferred to No. 13 Squadron RNAS. By 5 December 1917, his score had risen to six, and he was awarded the Distinguished Flying Cross.

On 17 January 1918, he was reported accidentally injured in Flight newsletter, though the date of injury was not reported. By the end of April 1918, he had amassed 166 combat flight hours. By this time, No. 13 Squadron RNAS had been incorporated into the nascent Royal Air Force. This incorporation may account for the fact that on 13 May 1918, Lieutenant Pinder was appointed as a temporary captain while employed as such, as flight commanders in the RAF were ranked as captains.

Pinder's Distinguished Flying Cross was finally gazetted on 3 June 1918. By the time Pinder left 213 Squadron at the end of August 1918 for an Air Ministry post with the Grand Fleet, his aerial victory score stood at 12. He would not remain at his new posting for long, as he joined No. 45 Squadron RAF of the Independent Air Force in October. He would score five more victories while serving in this squadron, bringing his total to 17.

List of aerial victories
See also Aerial victory standards of World War I

Post World War I
After war's end, Pinder received some belated honours; on 3 June 1919 he was both Mentioned in Despatches and received a Bar in lieu of a second award of the Distinguished Flying Cross. On 17 June 1919, he was elected to Royal Aero Club membership.

He was granted a short service commission as a Flying Officer in the RAF on 24 October 1919, though this appointment was later cancelled. On 6 December 1919, he transferred to the unemployed list of the RAF.

After the war, Pinder was an aviation pioneer in South America. In August 1920, he was part of a group attempting the first flight between Brazil and Buenos Aires. Pinder teamed with Brazilian Lieutenant Aliatar Martins to make this flight in a Macchi M.9 flying boat. The aircraft disappeared. The bodies of Pinder and Martins were found on 27 August. Loss of a propeller had apparently crashed their aircraft.

Other accounts give more detail. They state that Pinder and Martins landed in the Lagoa dos Esteves, Içara to repair a propeller. After it was fixed, they tried to restart the airplane's engine. In the process, Martins was knocked into the lagoon by the propeller, and his arm was broken. Pinder dived in to save him, but both men drowned. After the drownings, a search party found the seaplane in the lagoon and threatened to kill all the local men in the vicinity because there was suspicion of foul play. There was a general exodus of these men into the woods to hide from suspicion. One courageous local man aided the ten-day search. Pinder and Martins were originally buried in the first graves of the local cemetery, but were removed several years later.

References
 Above the Trenches: A Complete Record of the Fighter Aces and Units of the British Empire Air Forces 1915-1920. Christopher F. Shores, Norman L. R. Franks, Russell Guest. Grub Street, 1990. , .
 Conquistadors of the Sky: A History of Aviation in Latin America. Dan Hagedorn, 2008. University Press of Florida. .

Endnotes

Royal Naval Air Service aviators
1898 births
1920 deaths
British World War I flying aces
People from Deal, Kent
Recipients of the Distinguished Flying Cross (United Kingdom)
Deaths by drowning
Accidental deaths in Brazil